Clinton County is a county in the Commonwealth of Pennsylvania.  As of the 2020 census, the population was 37,450. Its county seat is Lock Haven. The county was created on June 21, 1839, from parts of Centre and Lycoming Counties. Its name is in honor of the seventh Governor of New York, DeWitt Clinton.  Some alternate sources suggest the namesake is Henry Clinton. Clinton County comprises the Lock Haven, PA Micropolitan Statistical Area, which is also included in the Williamsport-Lock Haven, PA Combined Statistical Area.

Geography

The county has a humid continental climate which is warm-summer (Dfb) except in lower areas near the West Branch and the Bald Eagle Creek which are hot-summer (Dfa). Average monthly temperatures in Lock Haven range from 26.5 °F in January to 72.2 °F in July, while in Renovo they range from 25.6 °F in January to 71.0 °F in July.

Adjacent counties
Potter County (north)
Lycoming County (east)
Union County (southeast)
Centre County (south)
Clearfield County (southwest)
Cameron County (west)

Landforms
 Bear Mountain - a USGS GNIS registered mountain peak ( at Latitude/Longitude: 41.0095121,-77.4338743 or 41°00'34"N,077°26'02"W) on the "Mill Hall" topographic map

Major highways

Demographics

As of the census of 2000, there were 37,914 people, 14,773 households, and 9,927 families residing in the county. The population density was 43 people per square mile (16/km2). There were 18,166 housing units at an average density of 20 per square mile (8/km2). The racial makeup of the county was 98.3% White, 0.52% Black or African American, 0.1% Native American, 0.4% Asian, <0.1% Pacific Islander, 0.2% from other races, and 0.5% from two or more races. 0.5% of the population were Hispanic or Latino of any race. 36.0% were of German, 15.6% American, 9.6% Irish, 8.6% Italian and 7.4% English ancestry.

There were 14,773 households, out of which 27.7% had children under the age of 18 living with them, 54.0% were married couples living together, 9.4% had a female householder with no husband present, and 32.8% were non-families. 26.6% of all households were made up of individuals, and 13.6% had someone living alone who was 65 years of age or older. The average household size was 2.42 and the average family size was 2.90.

In the county, the population was spread out, with 21.5% under the age of 18, 13.6% from 18 to 24, 25.5% from 25 to 44, 22.7% from 45 to 64, and 16.8% who were 65 years of age or older. The median age was 38 years. For every 100 females there were 94.20 males. For every 100 females age 18 and over, there were 91.20 males.

2020 Census

Micropolitan Statistical Area

The United States Office of Management and Budget has designated Clinton County as the Lock Haven, PA Micropolitan Statistical Area (µSA). As of the 2010 U.S. Census the micropolitan area ranked 16th most populous in the State of Pennsylvania and the 315th most populous in the United States with a population of 39,238. Clinton County is also a part of the Williamsport-Lock Haven, PA Combined Statistical Area (CSA), which combines the population of both Clinton County and the Lycoming County areas. The Combined Statistical Area ranked 11th in the State of Pennsylvania and 143rd most populous in the United States with a population of 155,349.

Government and politics

|}

As of November 1, 2021, there are 21,907 registered voters in Clinton County.

 Republican: 11,861 (54.14%)
 Democratic: 7,214 (32.93%)
 Independent: 1,959 (8.94%)
 Third Party: 873 (3.99%)

While Clinton County has historically been Republican like the rest of central Pennsylvania, Democrats captured the registration edge in early 2008. Each of the three row-office statewide winners carried Clinton in 2008. In 2006, Democrat Bob Casey Jr. received 54% of its vote when he unseated incumbent Republican US Senator Rick Santorum and Ed Rendell received 56% of the vote against Lynn Swann. The conservative tendencies of the county were again reestablished in 2008 when then-Senator Obama lost the county vote 48% to John McCain's 51%. This was followed in 2010 with U.S. Senate candidate, Republican Pat Toomey, receiving 59% to 41% for Democrat Joe Sestak. In 2012, Mitt Romney carried the county 55% to President Obama's 43%, while incumbent Democratic Senator Bob Casey, Jr. received 44% to his Republican challenger, Tom Smith's 53% .

County commissioners
Miles Kessinger, Chairman, Republican
Jeffrey Snyder, Republican
Angela Harding, Democrat

Other county offices
Chief Clerk, Jann Meyers
Clerk of Courts and Prothonotary, Cynthia Love, Republican
District Attorney, David Strouse, Democrat
Register of Wills, Jennifer Hoy, Republican
Treasurer, Michelle Kunes, Republican
Auditor, Rita O'Brien, Republican
Auditor, Michelle Crowell, Democrat
Auditor, Brooke Fravel, Republican
Sheriff, Kerry Stover, Democrat

State Senate

State House of Representatives

United States House of Representatives

United States Senate

Education

Colleges and universities
Lock Haven University of Pennsylvania

Public school districts
Jersey Shore Area School District (also in Lycoming County)
Keystone Central School District (also in Centre County)
West Branch Area School District (also in Clearfield County)

Recreation
There are five Pennsylvania state parks in Clinton County.
Bucktail State Park Natural Area is a  scenic route along Pennsylvania Route 120 stretching from Lock Haven to Emporium in Cameron County.
Hyner Run State Park
Hyner View State Park
Kettle Creek State Park
Ravensburg State Park

Communities

Under Pennsylvania law, there are four types of incorporated municipalities: cities, boroughs, townships, and, in at most two cases, towns. The following cities, boroughs and townships are located in Clinton County:

City
Lock Haven (county seat)

Boroughs
Avis
Beech Creek
Flemington
Loganton
Mill Hall
Renovo
South Renovo

Townships

Allison
Bald Eagle
Beech Creek
Castanea
Chapman
Colebrook
Crawford
Dunnstable
East Keating
Gallagher
Greene
Grugan
Lamar
Leidy
Logan
Noyes
Pine Creek
Porter
Wayne
West Keating
Woodward

Census-designated places
Census-designated places are unincorporated communities designated by the U.S. Census Bureau for the purposes of compiling demographic data. They are not actual jurisdictions under Pennsylvania law.

Castanea
Clintondale
Dunnstown
Farwell
Lamar
McElhattan
North Bend
Rauchtown
Rote
Salona
Tylersville
Woolrich

Other unincorporated communities

Cooks Run
Farrandsville
Hyner
Keating
Mackeyville
Westport

Population ranking
The population ranking of the following table is based on the 2010 census of Clinton County.

† county seat

See also
 National Register of Historic Places listings in Clinton County, Pennsylvania

References

External links

Clinton County Government Homepage
Open Access edition of The History of Centre and Clinton counties, Pennsylvania (1883) by John Blair Linn at the Penn State University Library website

 
1839 establishments in Pennsylvania
Counties of Appalachia
Populated places established in 1839